Ushirogami Hikaretai (うしろ髪ひかれ隊) was a Japanese idol J-pop band, active from 1987 to 1988. It was the third sub-group of Onyanko Club, consisting of three of its members: Shizuka Kudō, Akiko Ikuina, and Makiko Saitō, the group debuted during the "Onyanko Yumekojo Sailing 87'" tour.

Biography
In April 1987, a new sub-group, Ushirogami Hikaretai, was formed to replace Ushiroyubi Sasaregumi, which was disbanded when Mamiko Takai graduated from Onyanko Club, and Shizuka Kudō, Akiko Ikuina, and Makiko Saitō were selected as its members. Initially,  was to be selected over Saitō, but it was concluded that Kaise was not suitable to be a member. At the time of its formation, Ikuina was considered the main figure. In May 1987, their debut song, was released. This song was the theme song for the anime High School! Kimengumi and ranked number one on the Oricon charts. The quality of this song is highly acclaimed, and some consider it the best Onyanko Club-related song. In July 1987, they hosted a radio show, along with TV personality Tsutomu Sekine. Although Onyanko Club disbanded in September 1987, Ushirogami Hikaretai continued its activities, and they held concerts, but their activities were suspended in May 1988. As a result, they released five singles and three albums, as well as a video of their concert held at the Tokyo Kōsei Nenkin Kaikan.

, chief director of the variety show , said their teamwork was pretty good. Musician , who wrote the lyrics for Ushirogami Hikaretai's songs, noted that unlike other Onyanko Club songs, their songs were of very high quality because they were based on music that had been meticulously developed under the famous director . He also considered them to be the legitimate successor of Candies.

In October 2008, its producer Yasushi Akimoto announced its re-formation as Watarirouka Hashiritai with four members from his new production AKB48, the modern successor of Onyanko Club. So far, Watarirouka Hashiritai has performed the second Blue Dragon (anime) opening .

Members

Shizuka Kudō 
Shizuka Kudō (工藤静香, Kudō Shizuka, born April 14, 1970 in Ginza, Tokyo, Japan)

Akiko Ikuina 
Akiko Ikuina (生稲晃子, Ikuina Akiko, born April 28, 1968 in Setagaya, Tokyo, Japan)

Makiko Saitō 
Makiko Saitō (斎藤満喜子, Saitō Makiko, born September 19, 1970 in Hiroshima, Japan)

Her trademark was her very thick eyebrows, a trait she possessed from birth. She also had an interest in the entertainment industry and auditioned for a number of shows, and at one point was an assistant on a local radio program. This led her to become a member of Onyanko Club, and she started living in a dormitory in Tokyo with other Onyanko Club members who had also come from rural areas like her. She also attended Horikoshi High School, where many celebrities have been enrolled. In April 1987, she was selected as a member of the sub-group Ushirogami Hikaretai. In May 1988, Ushirogami Hikaretai went on hiatus. In July 1988, she made her solo debut with a song called  and also became one of the hosts of a TV show called .

Subsequently, she often appeared on variety shows. As a reporter for a popular quiz show called Naruhodo! The World, she visited more than 25 countries. In August 2021, she made her first public appearance since her marriage on a TV show hosted by Nobuo Serizawa, a professional golfer with whom she used to work on a golf program.

Discography
Singles

1987.05.07 : Toki no Kawa wo Koete
1987.08.12 : Anata wo Shiritai
1987.11.11 : Mobius no Koibito
1988.02.25 : Horane, Haru ga Kita
1988.04.29 : Kyou wa Saikou!

Albums

1987.09.05 : Ushirogami Hikaretai
1988.03.05 : BAB
1988.07.06 : Hora ne, Haru ga Kita - First Concert (live)

Videos

Further reading

References

External links
Ushirogami Hikaretai on Idollica

Japanese pop music groups
Japanese girl groups
Japanese idol groups
Onyanko Club
Musical groups established in 1987
Musical groups disestablished in 1988
1987 establishments in Japan
Musical groups from Tokyo